Bagno a Ripoli is a comune (municipality) in the Metropolitan City of Florence in the Italian region Tuscany, located about  southeast of Florence.

The International School of Florence has its primary school campus in the comune.

See also
Convento dell'Incontro

References

External links 

 Official website

Cities and towns in Tuscany